"Donne-moi le temps" (English: "Give Me the Time") is a 2002 song recorded by the French artist Jenifer Bartoli. Released on 15 April 2003, it was her fourth and last single, from her eponymous album, Jenifer. This song met success in France and Belgium (Wallonia) where it was a top ten hit.

Song information
Written by Pierre Lorain and composed by So, the pop ballad deals with a love relationship.

The song features on many French compilations, such as Les plus belles voix 2, Hits & Co, Now! Hits Référence Vol. 6, Stars France 2003 vol. 2, Hits France 2003 and NRJ Music Awards 2004. The song was performed on Jenifer's first tour and was thus included on her live album Jenifer fait son live, as the sixth track.

"Donne-moi le temps" was performed as a duet by Jenifer and Grégory Lemarchal on the French show Star Academy 4. In 2013, the song was covered by Hélène Segara, Natasha St Pier, Claire Keim, Alizée and L'Orchestre Ostinato on the album La boîte à musique des Enfoirés.

Chart performances
The single entered the French chart at number 21 on 19 April 2003 and  hit number eight in its fourth week. Then it almost did not stop to drop on the chart, remaining for two weeks in the top ten, 18 weeks in the top 50 and 26 weeks on the chart (top 100). It was ranked at number 48 on the End of the Year Chart.

The single was charted for 15 weeks in Belgium (Wallonia), from 26 April 2003. It started at number 39 and reached a peak at number seven in its seventh week. Then the single dropped and totaled six weeks in the top ten. It features at number 37 on the Annual Chart.

In Switzerland, the single appeared at number 25 on 27 April 2003, then reached number 18 for two non consecutive weeks. It stayed for ten weeks in the top 50 and 21 weeks in the top 100.

Track listings
 CD single
 "Donne-moi le temps" (New mix) — 4:11
 "Entre humains" (Lisa Miskovsky/adapt. Alana Filippi) — 3:58

 Digital download
 "Donne-moi le temps" — 4:11
 "Donne-moi le temps" (2005 live version) — 4:23

Credits

Personnel
Pierre Jaconelli: guitar
Angepier: keyboards, piano & programming
Dominique Grimaldi: bass guitar
Christophe Deschamps: drums & percussion
Denis Benarrosh: percussion
Jean-François Berger: string arrangement & conducting
Roland Chosson: French horn
Cyril Normand: French horn

Design
Antoine Verglas: front cover photography
Michel Sedan: back cover photography
Happydesign: cover design

Charts

Weekly charts
 Jénifer version

 Les Enfoirés version

Year-end charts

References

External links
 "Donne-moi le temps", lyrics + music video

2002 songs
2003 singles
Jenifer (singer) songs
Pop ballads